This is a list of rulers of Taungoo, the predecessor principality of the Taungoo Dynasty of what is now Myanmar. The principality of Taungoo, at the edge of the realm of Upper Burma-based kingdoms, was a rebellion-prone vassal state. The region was ruled by hereditary viceroys as well as appointed governors, depending on the power of the high king at Pinya, and later Inwa (Ava). Many of the rulers of Taungoo were assassinated while in office, and a few others died in action, showing the frontier nature of the region. The high kings at Ava at times had only nominal control or no control in many stretches. After 1612, the office of viceroy at Taungoo became a mere appointed governorship as the Restored Taungoo kings abolished then existing hereditary viceroyships throughout the entire Irrawaddy valley.

Origins
The first recorded administration of the Taungoo region came in 1191 when King Sithu II appointed Ananda Thuriya, a son-in-law of his, to be governor of Kanba Myint, a settlement on the Swa stream, a tributary of the Paunglaung, about 40 km north of present-day Taungoo. The first governor was succeeded by his son, Min Hla Saw, who in turn was succeeded by his son, Thawun Letya. According to the chronicle Toungoo Yazawin, Thawun Gyi and Thawun Nge, the two sons of Thawun Letya founded a new settlement near the present-day city of Taungoo, about 40 km south of Kanba Myint, in 1279. It was named Taungoo ("Hill's Spur") because of its location by the hills.

List of rulers

See also
 List of Burmese monarchs
 List of rulers of Ava
 List of rulers of Martaban
 List of rulers of Pegu
 List of rulers of Prome

Notes

References

Bibliography
 
 
 
 

Toungoo